Disney's Port Orleans Resort French Quarter and Disney's Port Orleans Resort Riverside are a pair of hotels located at the Walt Disney World Resort in Lake Buena Vista, Florida that form a single resort. The two hotels are themed to look like New Orleans and the Old South. Both resorts are located in the Disney Springs area and owned and operated by Disney Parks, Experiences and Products.

The two resorts are connected to each other and Disney Springs via the Sassagoula River. They are jointly the largest resort on the Walt Disney World property by room total, with over 3000 rooms between them. The Riverside section alone is the second-largest resort in Walt Disney World.

Resort description

History

Disney's Port Orleans Resort French Quarter was designed to reflect the style and architecture of New Orleans' French Quarter. The resort opened on May 17, 1991, as Disney's Port Orleans Resort with 432 guest rooms in three guest buildings. It later expanded to its current 1,008 rooms in seven three-story guest buildings containing 144 rooms each.

Disney's Port Orleans Resort Riverside was designed to reflect the Antebellum South along the Mississippi River. The resort opened on February 2, 1992, as Disney's Dixie Landings Resort, initially with rooms located in its Alligator Bayou section. Shortly afterward, the remaining Magnolia Bend section was opened. Alligator Bayou has 1,024 guest rooms over 16 buildings, styled as rustic, weathered lodges, with 64 rooms per lodge. Magnolia Bend has 1,024 guest rooms over four buildings styled as southern plantation grand manor homes, with 256 rooms per mansion.

Beginning March 1, 2001, road signage and other theming began to change, reflecting the Disney's Port Orleans Resort and Disney's Dixie Landings Resort properties becoming "regions" of a united Disney's Port Orleans Resort. As of April 1, 2001, the regions became French Quarter and Riverside. Changes leading up to and after this period included the French Quarter region losing Bonfamille's Cafe table-service restaurant, bike rentals, and boat rentals. French Quarter region guests had to use the larger facilities in the Riverside region. Bonfamille's Cafe is now only used occasionally as a meeting space for food and beverage management and a training facility. Bonfamille's Cafe's kitchen is Disney World's test kitchen. Other theme changes included Colonel's Cotton Mill food court becoming Riverside Mill.

In 2011, Disney transformed about a quarter of the 2,000 rooms in the "Riverside" section of Disney's Port Orleans Resort into the "Royal Guest Rooms."

On October 22, 2019, Disney expanded their Mobile Food Ordering system, to a total of 35 Quick Service locations, including the Riverside Mill Food Court at Riverside and Sassagoula Soda Floatworks and Food Factory at Port Orleans. This system allows guests to use the My Disney Experience app to pre-order their food prior to arrival at the food court.

The Original Scat cat's location would be replaced by a beignets cafe, called Scat Cat's Club Café and the lounge was moved to the old Bonfamille's Cafe. 

In 2020, the resort would close due to the worldwide COVID-19 pandemic and did not reopen until October 28, 2021 (French Quarter) and October 14, 2021 (Riverside) due to low occupancy.

References

External links

Official Disney site - French Quarter
Official Disney site - Riverside
PortOrleans.org - unofficial guide site
Port Orleans French Quarter at HanBan Photos
Port Orleans Riverside Photo Gallery at HanBan Photos

Hotel buildings completed in 1991
Hotel buildings completed in 1993
Hotels established in 1991
Port Orleans Resort
1991 establishments in Florida